The Diocese of San Angelo is a Latin Church ecclesiastical territory or diocese of the Catholic Church covering 29 counties throughout Central and West Texas. It was founded on October 16, 1961. The Diocese of San Angelo is a suffragan diocese in the ecclesiastical province of the  metropolitan Archdiocese of San Antonio.

On December 12, 2013, Pope Francis named Msgr. Michael J. Sis as the diocese's new bishop, and he was ordained bishop and installed on January 27, 2014.

Description

Major cities located in the diocese are Abilene, Big Spring, Brownwood, Fort Stockton, Midland, Odessa, San Angelo, and Sweetwater.

History 
Prior to 1961, much of the present-day Diocese was under the jurisdiction of the Diocese of Amarillo. Bishops and priests of that massive lay of land would occasionally be asked to travel great distances — sometimes over 400 miles one way — to visit the southernmost outposts of the West Texas Catholic community. It should go without saying that Church officials, especially those assigned to the Diocese of Amarillo, saw a great need in forming the new diocese in San Angelo.

Pope John XXIII decreed the establishment of the Diocese of San Angelo on October 16, 1961. In addition to Amarillo, some of the land that made up the new diocese was also taken from the dioceses of Austin, El Paso and Dallas-Fort Worth.

"The Church was growing here in a good way, a lot of people were coming into the church and felt it would be good to have a separate diocese," said the Most Rev. Michael D. Pfeifer, OMI, the fifth bishop of the diocese. "Plus, that was an extreme amount of territory for one bishop in Amarillo to cover — it's 450 miles from Amarillo to Junction."

According to Pfeifer, though, it was simply the growth of the Church in West Texas south of Amarillo that necessitated the creation of the diocese.

The need for the new diocese has proved to be expert foresight today, some 50 years later, as the Diocese of San Angelo now numbers over 82,000 Catholics in 47 parishes and 24 missions in three deaneries — San Angelo, Abilene and Midland-Odessa.

Some say the Church's actual roots in West Texas can even be traced back as far as the earliest Spanish explorers who spread the Gospel to Native Americans in the 1500s. Early records do, in fact, show the first sacraments being received by the Jumanos and others at a Mass at the confluence of the Concho rivers in 1629, in what would one day be San Angelo.

The Diocesan See, or headquarters, came to be located in San Angelo, not only for its relative centrality (although somewhere north of Mertzon would be closer to the actual geographic center) but Pope John XXIII's Italian name was Angelo Roncalli and, as legend has it, looking at a map and seeing a city with his name, the pope so designated San Angelo the See. "That's where it's going to be," the pope is reported to have said.

On January 31, 2019, the Diocese of San Angelo revealed a list containing the names of 12 priests and one Deacon who were credibly accused of committing acts of sex abuse. One of those listed died in prison, while two others were laicized and five removed from ministry. The accused clergy who weren't disciplined are deceased.

Bishops

Bishops of San Angelo
The list of ordinaries (bishops of the diocese) and their terms of service:
 Thomas Joseph Drury (1961–1965), appointed Bishop of Corpus Christi
 Thomas Ambrose Tschoepe (1966–1969), appointed Bishop of Dallas
 Stephen Aloysius Leven (1969–1979)
 Joseph Anthony Fiorenza (1979–1984), appointed Bishop and later Archbishop of Galveston-Houston
 Michael David Pfeifer (1985–2013)
 Michael Sis (2014–present)

Other priest of this diocese who became Bishop
Joe Steve Vásquez, appointed Auxiliary Bishop of Galveston-Houston in 2001 and later Bishop of Austin

See also

 Catholic Church in the United States
 Ecclesiastical Provinc of San Antonio
 List of the Catholic dioceses of the United States

References

External links
The Diocese of San Angelo Official Site

San Angelo
Roman Catholic Ecclesiastical Province of San Antonio
San Angelo
Christian organizations established in 1961
1961 establishments in Texas